The following is a timeline of the history of the city of Chemnitz, Germany.

Prior to 20th century

 1136 -  founded near Chemnitz.
 1143 - Chemnitz "becomes a market town."
 1398 - Paper mill established.
 1466 - Population: 3,455.
 16th. C. - "The manufacture of cloth was very flourishing."
 1539 - Protestant Reformation.
 1546 - Benedictine monastery, founded in 1136 by the emperor Lothair II is dissolved.
 1551 - Population: 5,616.
 1630 - Battle of Chemnitz.
 1700 - Population: 4,873.
 1801 - Population: 10,835.
 1811 - Schwalbe manufactory in business (later  engineering firm).
 1833 -  formed.
 1836 - Royal Mercantile College established.
 1840 - Population: 23,476.
 1852 - Chemnitz Hauptbahnhof opens.
 1864 - Population: 54,827.
 1868 -  founded.
 1869 -  (bank) founded.
 1878 -  in use (approximate date).
 1880
 Horsecar tram begins operating.
 Population: 95,123.
  becomes part of city.
 1884 - Chemnitz Tar Mummy discovered.
 1885 - Population: 110,817. 
 1888 -  built.
 1890 - Population: 138,954.
 1893 - Electric tram begins operating.
 1895 - Population: 161,017. 
 1898 - Horsecar tram stop operating.
 1899 -  built.

20th century

 1905 - Population: 244,927. 
 1907 -  becomes part of city.
 1909
 Chemnitz Opera hall built.
  opens.
 1910 - Johann-Wolfgang-von-Goethe-Gymnasium (school) established.
 1911 -  built.
 1913 -  becomes part of city.
 1919 - Population: 303,775.
 1920 -  sport club formed.
 1926 - Airport Chemnitz opens.
 1926 - Südkampfbahn stadium opens.
 1930 - Modernised classification yard Hilbersdorf opens.
 1933 -  renamed "Adolf Hitler Platz".
 1934 - Stadion an der Gellertstraße (stadium) opens.
 1938 - 9 November: Kristallnacht antisemitic unrest; synagogue destroyed.
 1944 - Subcamp of the Flossenbürg concentration camp established. Over 500 women, mostly Russian, Polish, Italian and Slovenian, were held there as slave labour.
 1945
 .
 April: Subcamp of the Flossenbürg concentration camp dissolved. Its prisoners were sent on a death march to German-occupied Rtyně nad Bílinou.
 City becomes part of East Germany.
 1946 - Population: 250,188.
 1947 - Wismut (mining company) headquartered in Chemnitz.
 1950 -  becomes part of city.
 1953 - City renamed "Karl-Marx-Stadt".
 1955 - Chemnitz Botanical Garden rebuilt.
 1959 -  reconstructed.

 1960 -  (workers' cultural festival) held.
 1961
 HKW Chemnitz-Nord power station begins operating.
 City twinned with Tampere, Finland.
 1966
 Chemnitzer FC (football club) formed.
 City twinned with Ljubljana, Yugoslavia.
 1967 - City twinned with Arras, France.
 1968 - City twinned with Timbuktu, Mali.
 1970 - City twinned with Ústí nad Labem, Czechoslovakia.
 1971 - 9 October: Karl Marx Monument unveiled.
 1972
 City twinned with Łódź, Poland.
 Population: 301,502.
 1974 -  (housing) construction begins.
 1986 - City hosts the 1986 European Weightlifting Championships.
 1988 - City twinned with Düsseldorf, West Germany.
 1990
 City renamed "Chemnitz".
  (transit entity) established.
 Population: 294,244.
 1991 - Annual "Days of Jewish Culture" begins.
 1993 -  becomes mayor.
 1997 - City-Bahn Chemnitz (transit entity) established.
 1999 -  and  become part of city.

21st century

 2001 -  restored as a cultural space.
 2002 - Neue Synagoge opens. 
 2003 -  opens.
 2006 -  becomes mayor.
 2007 - Gunzenhauser Museum opens.
 2010 - Population: 243,248.
 2012 - Thor Steinar "Brevik" shop in business.
 2014 - March: Neo-Nazi  group banned.
 2014 - SMAC (Saxonian Museum of Archaeology Chemnitz) opens in the restored historical Mendelsohn building (former "Schocken").
 2018 - Protests.
 2020 - Stefan-Heym-Forum opens in a restored historical building (today "Kulturkaufhaus Tietz").
 2020 - Sven Schulze becomes mayor.
 2021 - Chemnitz becomes German main part of the Hydrogen and Mobility Innovation Center ("HIC").

See also
 Chemnitz history
 
 
 

Other cities in the state of Saxony:
 Timeline of Dresden
 Timeline of Leipzig

References

This article incorporates information from the German Wikipedia.

Bibliography

in English

in German
 
 
 
 Harald Weber. Aus der Geschichte von Chemnitz und Umgebung. Verlag für sächsische Regionalgeschichte, Nördlingen 2000, .

External links

 Links to fulltext city directories for Chemnitz via Wikisource
 Europeana. Items related to Chemnitz, various dates.
 Digital Public Library of America. Items related to Chemnitz, various dates

History of Chemnitz
Years in Germany
Chemnitz
Chemnitz